WUTC 88.1 is a public radio station in Chattanooga, Tennessee in the United States - serving Chattanooga and the Tennessee Valley.  

Since going on the air in 1979, it has been owned and operated by the University of Tennessee at Chattanooga and broadcasts from UTC campus, moving from its longtime location in Cadek Hall to the Chattanooga State Office Building in 2022.  The station is a member of National Public Radio, Public Radio International and American Public Media - and broadcasts a variety of modern music, including alternative, rock and related genres.

WUTC's broadcast radius covers approximately 100+ miles across four states - Tennessee, North Carolina, Georgia, and Alabama - except to the west, being limited by Monteagle Mountain. 

Until 1988, WUTC rebroadcast the morning programming of WUOT-FM in Knoxville - and then, the station obtained its own satellite downlink and was able to obtain nationally syndicated programming on its own.  In October 1995, WUTC became the exclusive home in the Chattanooga market for several NPR programs, including Morning Edition, All Things Considered, Car Talk and Weekend Edition - when the nearby WSMC-FM dropped them due to conflicts with religious programming on its schedule .  

Today, WUTC maintains a mix of syndicated programming and local music shows in its weekday schedule, with a focus on syndicated shows almost exclusively on weekends.  In July 2002, WUTC began streaming its broadcast online.  In May 2006, it became the first Chattanooga radio station (public or commercial) to simulcast its broadcast in HD Radio  format.

In March 2017, the University of Tennessee at Chattanooga fired WUTC reporter Jacqui Helbert, who interviewed state politicians about the transgender bathroom bill, after they suggested they did not know she was a journalist even though she was reportedly wearing headphones and a microphone with the WUTC logo.  The dismissal came after state legislators complained to university officials.  Station and university officials said that Helbert breached journalistic ethics by not identifying herself as a journalist or giving the legislators a chance to comment before the story aired.  However, critics claimed station and university officials overreacted out of fear that the legislature would reduce their funding.

References

External links
WUTC official website

WUTC department at UTC

University of Tennessee at Chattanooga
UTC
WUTC